Zhiguo He is a Chinese financial economist serving as the Fuji Bank and Heller Professor of Finance at the University of Chicago Booth School of Business, where he has taught since 2008. He is also a research associate at the National Bureau of Economic Research, executive editor of Review of Asset Pricing Studies, faculty director of BFI-China at the Becker Friedman Institute for Research in Economics, faculty co-director of the Fama-Miller Center, member of the academy committee at the Luohan Academy, and special-term Alibaba Foundation Professor of Finance at Tsinghua University. He earned his Ph.D. from the Kellogg School of Management at Northwestern University.

Research

He’s research focuses on the implications of agency frictions and debt maturities in financial markets and macroeconomics, especially related to contract theory and banking. His most-cited paper “Intermediary Asset Pricing,” co-authored with Arvind Krishnamurthy, presents a model explaining financial crises in markets with complex securities such as mortgage-backed securities and corporate bonds. Complicating the traditional asset pricing literature, which considers financial intermediaries to be veils for household investors, this paper understands intermediaries to be marginal investors and offers a framework for understanding and evaluating government policies during such a financial crisis.
 
More recently, He has been studying rapidly developing Chinese financial markets and cryptocurrency. For example, “The Financing of Local Government in China: Stimulus Loan Wanes and Shadow Banking Waxes,” co-authored with Zhuo Chen and Chun Liu, attributes the rise of shadow banking around 2013 in China to a stimulus loan hangover effect that results from the four-trillion-yuan stimulus package in 2009 and draws parallels to a similar phenomenon in the US national banking era. His paper on cryptocurrency, “Decentralized Mining in Centralized Pools,” co-authored with L. William Cong and Jiasun Li, highlights that while risk sharing leads to the consolidation of mining pools, over-consolidation of mining pools is not a concern as long as miners can freely allocate their hash rates.

Awards

In 2008, He received the Lehman Brothers Fellowship for Research Excellence in Finance and in 2014, he received a Sloan Research Fellowship. He has won both top paper prizes from the Journal of Finance: he won the Brattle Group First Prize in 2012 for his paper “Rollover Risk and Credit Risk,” co-authored with Wei Xiong, and again in 2021 for his paper “Leverage Dynamics without Commitment,” co-authored with Peter DeMarzo; he won the 2014 Amundi Smith-Breeden First Prize for his paper “A Theory of Debt Maturity: The Long and Short of Debt Overhang,” co-authored with Douglas Diamond. He was also named a Rising Star at Fordham University’s 2018 Rising Stars Conference.

References

Living people
Kellogg School of Management alumni
University of Chicago Booth School of Business faculty
Tsinghua University alumni
Economists from Zhejiang
Northwestern University alumni
Sloan Research Fellows
Year of birth missing (living people)
Educators from Shaoxing